is a Japanese ice hockey goaltender and member of the Japanese national team, currently playing with DK Peregrine in the Women's Japan Ice Hockey League (WJIHL) and All-Japan Women's Ice Hockey Championship.

Playing career
As a junior player with the Japanese national under-18 team, she participated in the 2016 IIHF U18 Women's World Championship.

Masuhara was a part of the Japanese delegation at the 2022 Winter Olympics in Beijing. Selected as a reserve player for the women's ice hockey tournament, she did not dress for any games. 

She was Japan's starting goaltender at the 2022 IIHF Women's World Championship, where she maintained a steady 91.48 save percentage across six games and recorded a 61-shot shutout againt  in the fifth place game.

Masuhara won a silver medal with the Japanese team in the women's ice hockey tournament at the 2023 Winter World University Games in Lake Placid, New York.

References

External links 
 
 

2001 births
Living people
Ice hockey players at the 2022 Winter Olympics
Japanese women's ice hockey goaltenders
Medalists at the 2023 Winter World University Games
Olympic ice hockey players of Japan
Universiade medalists in ice hockey
Universiade silver medalists for Japan
WJIHL players